Exploration and Empire: The Explorer and the Scientist in the Winning of the American West  is a book by William H. Goetzmann. It won the Pulitzer Prize for History in 1967. The Book is about the exploration of the American West.

References 

Pulitzer Prize for History-winning works
American history books
American political books